WCRI may refer to:

 WCRI-FM, a radio station (95.9 FM) licensed to Block Island, Rhode Island, United States
 WSKP (AM), a radio station (1180 AM) licensed to Hope Valley, Rhode Island, United States, known as WCRI from 2011 to 2013
 Walker Cancer Research Institute, a small American cancer research organization